Donald Mackintosh (1877 –1943) was a Scottish clergyman who served as the Roman Catholic Archbishop of Glasgow from 1922 to 1943.

Life
Donald Mackintosh was born on 10 October 1877 at Glasnacardoch, Inverness. He studied for the priesthood at Blairs College near Aberdeen, the Paris lower seminary and the Scots College in Rome, where he was ordained on 1 November 1900. Soon afterwards he appointed Vice-Rector of the College. In 1907, he was made a privy Chamberlain. Mackintosh became rector of the Scots College in 1913, and was made a Domestic Prelate the following year.

Mackintosh was appointed Archbishop of the Metropolitan see of Glasgow on 24 February 1922 and consecrated to the Episcopate on 21 May 1922. His principal consecrator was Cardinal Gaetano de Lai, Secretary of the Sacred Consistorial Congregation, and the principal co-consecrators were Henry Gray Graham, Auxiliary Bishop of Saint Andrews and Edinburgh and Donald Martin, Bishop of Argyll and The Isles.

According to Thomas Gerard Gallagher, by 1940, "Archbishop Mackintosh was a chronic invalid who was unable to get around his archdiocese or properly supervise its activities." He died in office on 8 December 1943, aged 67. He had been a priest for 43 years and a bishop for 21 years. He was the principal consecrator of Andrew Thomas McDonald, Archbishop of Saint Andrews and Edinburgh.

References

1876 births
1943 deaths
Roman Catholic archbishops of Glasgow
People from Inverness
20th-century Roman Catholic bishops in Scotland
Scottish Roman Catholic bishops